Krept and Konan is a British hip hop duo from London, consisting of Casyo Valentine "Krept" Johnson BEM (born 4 February 1990, Gipsy Hill) and Karl Dominic "Konan" Wilson BEM (born 3 September 1989, Thornton Heath), the son of Delroy Wilson otherwise known as 'Jamaica's first child star'. Their first major release was the mixtape Young Kingz, released on 2 September 2013. As of 3 May 2013, Krept and Konan signed a record deal with Virgin EMI Records.

Their debut album The Long Way Home was released on 5 July 2015 and entered the UK Albums Chart at number 2. The duo's highest-charting single is "Freak of the Week" featuring Jeremih, which charted at number 9 on the UK Singles Chart. Krept and Konan have both starred together in the film The Intent (2016) and reprised their roles in the prequel The Intent 2: The Come Up (2018).

Early life 
Krept is one of two siblings. His father was in prison for drug offences and his older brother was "a lot of trouble", so he felt like his mother's last hope.
Krept went to secondary school at Stanley Technical College (now Harris Academy South Norwood), while Konan went to Haling Manor School (now Harris Academy Purley). Krept studied accounting at the University of Portsmouth.

Konan was arrested multiple times in his youth, including for stealing a jumper and robbing a McDonalds restaurant. He went to jail for a year in 2007 for the latter offence.

Music career

2005–2010: Formation and career beginnings
In 2005, Krept and Konan met and formed a friendship when their schools played each other at football. They were making music under the same aliases but were also members of 'Gipset', a gang based in Gipsy Hill, in which Cadet, who was Krept's cousin, was also involved. In 2009 they became a musical duo and started to take music seriously. Shortly after their formation, in 2010 the duo released their first mixtape titled Redrum featuring collaborations from London underground rappers, Killa Ki, Snap and many more.

In 2010 the rap duo released their second mixtape titled Tsunami featuring several mainstream artists including Ghetts, Giggs, Scorcher and Lil Nova.

2011–2014: Young Kingz and commercial breakthrough

In 2011, they released a cover of Jay-Z's and Kanye West's "Otis" which helped them rise to fame. The video reached five million views in its first five days of being uploaded to YouTube. However, with much pressure received from Jay-Z's legal team the video was removed from the duo's profile. Undeterred by the controversy, they released a cover of Drake and Lil Wayne's "The Motto", launched their own clothing line called Play Dirty and early into 2012 were invited to join the British rapper Skepta on his tour in the UK. They appeared on Tinie Tempah's 2011 mixtape Happy Birthday and in 2013 they released their third mixtape Young Kingz, with features from Chip, Tinie Tempah, G FrSH, Giggs, George the Poet, Yungen, Ari, Yana Toma, Fekky, Siah and Anthony Thomas. The album's promotional single "Don't Waste My Time" rose to fame in January 2014, with notable artists such as French Montana, Wretch 32, Chip, G FrSH, Double S, Lady Leshurr, Yungen, Sneakbo MNEK, Dru Blu, Jacob Banks and Dot Rotten all contributing to remixes of the track. Tinie Tempah also freestyled over the beat on Charlie Sloth's Fire in the Booth.

Winning Best UK Newcomer at the 2013 MOBO Awards was one of the big breaks the duo had. With low promotion compared to other artists. They released "Don't Waste My Time" as a single in March 2014 and it entered the UK Singles Chart at number 154.

2014–2017: The Long Way Home, 7 Days and 7 Nights 
On 29 June 2014, they attended the BET Awards which was held at the Nokia Theatre L.A. Live in Los Angeles, California and received an award for 'Best International Act: UK' by BET International and beating Dizzee Rascal, Laura Mvula, Rita Ora, Ghetts and Tinie Tempah.

On 3 March 2015, Croydon Advertiser announced the duo as the 39th most powerful people from the Croydon borough, for their pioneering movement and recent success in the music industry.

On 28 March 2015, they released a video for "Certified" featuring Rick Ross. The song serves as the first promotional single from their debut album The Long Way Home. The song was subsequently added to BBC Radio 1Xtra's playlists.

The Long Way Home was released in July 2015. The lead single from the album, "Freak of the Week", features vocals from American rapper Jeremih and was released on 28 June 2015. The song entered and peaked at number nine on the UK Singles Chart, making it the duo's first top ten single on the chart and Jeremih's second. 25 June 2015 on YouTube, a remix of "Freak of the Week" was published by reggae and dancehall artists Popcaan & Beenie Man. The album was released on 5 July 2015 through Virgin EMI and Def Jam, and features numerous high-profile musicians, including Ed Sheeran, Skepta, Emeli Sandé and Wiz Khalifa.

They released a double mixtape, 7 Days and 7 Nights on 19 October 2017. 7 Days focused on rap, whilst 7 Nights focused on RnB. They peaked at number 6 and number 8 respectively on the UK Singles Chart.

2017–2020: Revenge Is Sweet 
On 10 May 2018, Krept and Konan released a song called "Crepes and Cones (Ya Dun Know)" to promote their restaurant. It featured Mostack and was produced by Steel Banglez.

On 3 November 2019, the duo released their first album in four years, Revenge Is Sweet.

2021–present: We Are England 
In June 2021, Krept and Konan appeared in the BBC Three documentary Krept and Konan: We Are England, where they make a football song for the UEFA Euros Tournament and get to know the England squad.

Other projects 
Krept and Konan launched the Positive Direction foundation on 6 November 2017 at Harris Academy South Norwood, Krept's old school. The foundation provides workshops in "music production, engineering and songwriting".

The duo also launched their restaurant, Crepes & Cones, on 12 May 2018 alongside grime artist J2K. Hundreds of fans lined up during its opening weekend, with food shortages due to the large number of orders. The restaurant also employs young offenders to give them a chance to rehabilitate.

In 2019, Krept and Konan also created the first series of BBC Three's The Rap Game UK alongside DJ Target. Adopting the format of the US version, seven MCs battled to get signed for a single record deal. The show was renewed for a second season, which aired in 2020.

Personal lives 
Konan lost his stepfather on 1 July 2011, when masked gunmen followed Konan into the house. One of the gunmen had targeted Konan for dating his ex-girlfriend, but shot his stepfather in the chest when he tried to chase the gunmen out of the house. This experience was later told on the song "My Story".

Krept lost his cousin, named Cadet, in a car accident on 9 February 2019. He has a daughter with model Sasha Ellese, named Nala, who was born on 11 June 2020.

The duo lost close friend and business partner Nyasha "Nash" Chagonda to suicide in June 2018, who was commemorated in "Broski" on the album Revenge Is Sweet.

They are both avid supporters of football club Manchester United.

Achievements
In 2013, the duo broke the record for 'Highest-Charting UK album by an Unsigned Act'. The pair earned the title with Young Kingz, which entered into the top 20 in the UK Albums Chart. Following the rap duo success, they won a MOBO award (Best Hip-Hop Act 2014) and BET award.

Both were awarded the British Empire Medal (BEM) in the 2020 Birthday Honours for services to music and the community in Croydon.

Discography

Studio albums

Mixtapes

Singles

As lead artist

As featured artist

Other charted songs

Guest appearances

Filmography

Film

Television

Web

Tours
2011: Skepta Wedding Bells tour (supporting act)
2012: Devlin tour (supporting act)
2013: Young Kingz show live
2014: Tinie Tempah Demonstration tour (supporting act)
2016: Night to Remember Tour
2019: Revenge Is Sweet Tour

Awards and nominations

References

External links

English hip hop groups
English male rappers
English musical duos
Musical groups from London
Musical groups established in 2009
Black British musical groups
Rappers from London
Hip hop duos
Recipients of the British Empire Medal